George Davies (born 1 March 1927) is an English former professional footballer who played as a wing half. He played in the Football League for Sheffield Wednesday and Chester in the 1950s.

Playing career
Davies played for village side Llanymynech before spending four years with Oswestry Town. In June 1950 he moved to Sheffield Wednesday for £250, with his six years at Hillsborough including an appearance in the FA Cup semi–finals against Preston North End in 1953–54 at Maine Road.

After nearly 100 league appearances for Wednesday, Davies moved to Third Division North side Chester ahead of 1956–57, in a summer in which new manager John Harris also recruited Billy Foulkes, Ron Hansell and John Mulholland as a wave of enthusiasm gripped the club. Davies went on to score in a shock Welsh Cup victory over First Division side Cardiff City later in the campaign and also scored four league goals but he managed just two league appearances early the following season and joined Wellington Town, where he spent one season. After leaving football, Davies went on to work as a window cleaner in Chester.

Although he had a reputation as tough tackling player, Davies was never booked or sent off throughout his career.

Honours
Sheffield Wednesday
Football League Second Division champions: 1951–52 (19 apps)

Bibliography

References

External links

1927 births
English footballers
Living people
Oswestry Town F.C. players
Sheffield Wednesday F.C. players
Chester City F.C. players
Telford United F.C. players
English Football League players
Association football wing halves